Carol Montgomery (born August 24, 1966, in Sechelt, British Columbia) is an Olympic athlete from Canada who competed in triathlon and athletics. She won a bronze medal at the 1999 Pan American Games in Winnipeg, Manitoba, Canada, and a bronze and a silver at the 1995 Mar del Plata Pan American Games in the 5,000m and 10,000m respectively. She was the World Duathlon Champion in 1993. Once won, she never competed in another duathlon event. She won the gold medal in the 2002 Commonwealth Games in Manchester and often refers to this race as the highlight of her career.
 
She did race in high school but only in grades 8 to 10 before, returning to running while at Simon Fraser University in 1986, where she honed her running capabilities before embarking on her triathlon career.

Montgomery considered her triathlon career as a full-time "job", and thus competed in very few track races. She competed only once at 1,500m, six times at the 3,000m, six times at the 5,000m, and completed just nine 10,000m events.

She competed at the first Olympic triathlon at the 2000 Summer Olympics. She did not finish the competition due to a crash on the bike leg. She was also selected to compete in the 10,000 meters on the track, but had to withdraw due to injury sustained in the triathlon crash.

Four years later, at the 2004 Summer Olympics, Montgomery finished in 35th place with a time of 2:15:25.62.

Personal records
10000m - 32:11.19
5000m - 15:36.27
3000m - 9:04
1500m -  4:18

References

1965 births
Living people
Canadian female triathletes
Canadian female long-distance runners
Duathletes
Athletes (track and field) at the 1995 Pan American Games
Triathletes at the 1999 Pan American Games
Triathletes at the 2000 Summer Olympics
Triathletes at the 2004 Summer Olympics
Sportspeople from British Columbia
Commonwealth Games gold medallists for Canada
Athletes (track and field) at the 1994 Commonwealth Games
Triathletes at the 2002 Commonwealth Games
People from the Sunshine Coast Regional District
Pan American Games bronze medalists for Canada
Commonwealth Games medallists in triathlon
Pan American Games medalists in triathlon
Pan American Games medalists in athletics (track and field)
Olympic triathletes of Canada
Medalists at the 1995 Pan American Games
Medallists at the 2002 Commonwealth Games